Club Voleibol Ciutadella, also known as Avarca Menorca for sponsorship reasons, is a Spanish volleyball club from Ciutadella de Menorca in the Balearic Islands. Founded in 1985 merge of the teams of several local schools, it is best known for its women's team, which was promoted to the Superliga in 2006 and soon became one of the leading teams in the championship. In 2009 it was third, in 2010 it was the runner-up and in 2011 and 2012 it won the championship.

Titles
 Spanish League (2)
 2011, 2012
 Supercopa de España (1)
 2020

2013–14 season squad

References

External links
Official website

Sports teams in the Balearic Islands
Spanish volleyball clubs
Volleyball clubs established in 1985
1985 establishments in Spain